Dicalcium phosphate is the calcium phosphate with the formula CaHPO4 and its dihydrate. The "di" prefix in the common name arises because the formation of the HPO42– anion involves the removal of two protons from phosphoric acid, H3PO4. It is also known as dibasic calcium phosphate or calcium monohydrogen phosphate. Dicalcium phosphate is used as a food additive, it is found in some toothpastes as a polishing agent and is a biomaterial.

Preparation
Dibasic calcium phosphate is produced by the neutralization of calcium hydroxide with phosphoric acid, which precipitates the dihydrate as a solid. At 60 °C the anhydrous form is precipitated:

To prevent degradation that would form hydroxyapatite, sodium pyrophosphate or trimagnesium phosphate octahydrate are added when for example, dibasic calcium phosphate dihydrate is to be used as a polishing agent in toothpaste.

In a continuous process CaCl2 can be treated with (NH4)2HPO4 to form the dihydrate:

A slurry of the dihydrate is then heated to around 65–70 °C to form anhydrous CaHPO4 as a crystalline precipitate, typically as flat diamondoid crystals, which are suitable for further processing.

Dibasic calcium phosphate dihydrate is formed in "brushite" calcium phosphate cements (CPC's), which have medical applications. An example of the overall setting reaction in the formation of  "β-TCP/MCPM" (β-tricalcium phosphate/monocalcium phosphate) calcium phosphate cements is:

Structure
Three forms of dicalcium phosphate are known: 
 dihydrate, CaHPO4•2H2O ('DPCD'), the mineral brushite
monohydrate, CaHPO4•H2O ('DCPM')
 anhydrous CaHPO4, ('DCPA'), the mineral monetite. Below pH 4.8 the dihydrate and anhydrous forms of dicalcium phosphate are the most stable (insoluble) of the calcium phosphates.

The structure of the anhydrous and dihydrated forms have been determined by X-ray crystallography and the structure of the monohydrate was determined by electron crystallography. The dihydrate (shown in table above) as well as the monohydrate adopt layered structures.

Uses and occurrence
Dibasic calcium phosphate is mainly used as a dietary supplement in prepared breakfast cereals, dog treats, enriched flour, and noodle products. It is also used as a tableting agent in some pharmaceutical preparations, including some products meant to eliminate body odor. Dibasic calcium phosphate is also found in some dietary calcium supplements (e.g. Bonexcin). It is used in poultry feed.  It is also used in some toothpastes as a tartar control agent.

Heating dicalcium phosphate gives dicalcium diphosphate, a useful polishing agent:

In the dihydrate (brushite) form it is found in some kidney stones and in dental calculi.

See also
Brushite
Monocalcium phosphate
Tricalcium phosphate

References



Acid salts
Calcium compounds
Food additives
Phosphates
E-number additives